WBAU (90.3 FM) was the call sign of the student-operated radio station located at Adelphi University in Garden City, New York,  east of Midtown Manhattan. The new web-based radio station is PAWS Web Radio.

History 
WBAU was located at 90.3 on the FM dial, which it shared with WHPC, owned by Nassau Community College. Under the original agreement, WHPC owned the frequency from 9:00 AM until 5:00 PM, and WBAU owned it from 5:00 PM until 1:00 AM. From 1:00 AM until 9:00 AM, the two stations switched ownership of the frequency on an "odd–even day" basis, although neither station generally operated between 1:00 and 9:00 AM until 1982, when the agreement was amended to allow WBAU to operate daily between 6:30 and 9:00 AM. WBAU did take advantage of its time during its annual "Radiothon" fundraiser.

WBAU was originally called WALI, and broadcast entirely through carrier current at 640 on the AM dial. When, in 1971, the school decided to expand broadcast to the FM band, a protest by nearby WHLI (based on the call letters sounding so similar) led to the change to WBAU. Under these new call letters, the station began FM broadcasting in July 1972. They also continued broadcasting via carrier current to the school's dormitories and were piped directly into Post Hall (the resident students' dining hall) and the cafeteria in the Student Center. The first record played was "Long Time Gone" by Crosby, Stills & Nash.

WBAU's broadcast tower was originally located in Mitchel Field; however when the tower was taken down in 1981, the station reduced power to 130 watts and moved their antenna to the top of the student center. Three years later they secured a new, higher location atop the Marriott Hotel in Uniondale, New York. The new antenna broadcast WBAU's signal at an effective radiated power of 1,100 watts, making it one of the strongest signals on Long Island at the time.

In August 1995, due to a clash of philosophies between the university president and the student-run radio station, WBAU was abruptly shut down by the university. Its license and equipment were reportedly "voluntarily" sold to WHPC. The remnants of the dual control room, multichannel studios and the 10,000+ album record/CD library, which took over 40 years to collect, were discarded by the university.

Notable alumni and former radio staff 

 Andre "Doctor Dré" Brown, (former Yo! MTV Raps host), T-Money (also a former Yo! MTV Raps host), Rapper G., Easy G Rockwell, and Wildman Steve of Original Concept
 William "Flavor Flav" Drayton Jr. of Public Enemy
 Gary Dell'Abate
 Carlton "Chuck D" Ridenhour, Hank "Shocklee" Boxley, and Keith "Shocklee" Boxley of Public Enemy
 Adario Strange
 Jonathan M. Wolfert, founder of Jam Creative Productions

See also 
 WHPC — radio station at 90.3 FM that used to share time with WBAU

References

External links 
 PAWS Web Radio
 

Adelphi University
Defunct radio stations in the United States
BAU
Radio stations established in 1972
Mass media in Nassau County, New York
Radio stations disestablished in 1995
1972 establishments in New York (state)
1995 disestablishments in New York (state)
BAU